Big Spirit Lake is a natural body of water, approximately  in area, in Dickinson County in northwest Iowa in the United States. It is part of the chain of lakes known as the Iowa Great Lakes, the northern shore of the lake straddles the border with Minnesota. It is the largest natural lake in Iowa. The Dakotah Indian name for the lake was Minnewaukon. Early French traders named it Lac D' Esprit after the Indian legends of an evil spirit who dwelled in the lake.

Its maximum depth is 24 feet (7.3 m), and the mean depth is 17 feet (5 m). The drainage area of the lake is approximately 22 square miles (57 km²). It has a drainage area of approximately 75 mi² (194 km²), most of which is in Minnesota.

Geology
Geologically, the lake, like its neighbors, is a glacial pothole, a remnant of the most recent ice age approximately 13,000 years ago.

Recreation
The lake is a popular fishing destination in the region. It contains over 40 species of fish, 13 of which are typically caught. Fishing for walleye and yellow perch is typically done by boat or through the ice. Fishing for bullhead is common from the shore during the spring. A state-operated fish hatchery also provides significant populations of largemouth bass, smallmouth bass, northern pike, muskie, crappie, and bluegill.

The Iowa all-time big fish records for freshwater drum and muskellunge were set from catches in the lake.

Kiteboarding is also a popular activity on Big Spirit Lake.

See also 
 East Okoboji Lake
 West Okoboji Lake

External links

Iowa Department of Natural Resources site on Spirit Lake
University of Iowa site on Spirit Lake chemistry
Spirit Lake Fish Hatchery  Documentary produced by Iowa Public Television
Spirit Lake, Where Ice Fishing is Hot  Documentary produced by Iowa Public Television

Lakes of Iowa
Bodies of water of Dickinson County, Iowa